This is the complete list of physical number-one singles sold in Finland in 2005 according to the Official Finnish Charts, composed by Suomen Ääni- ja kuvatallennetuottajat ÄKT (since late August 2010, known as Musiikkituottajat – IFPI Finland).

Chart history

References

Number-one singles
Finland
2005